The Society for Immunotherapy of Cancer (SITC), previously known as the International Society for Biological Therapy of Cancer (iSBTc), is a professional society of scientists, academicians, researchers, clinicians, government representatives, and industry leaders from around the world dedicated to improving outcomes in patients with cancer by advancing the science and application of cancer immunotherapy. Currently, SITC has more than 2,400 members, representing 22 medical specialties from 42 countries around the world, who are engaged in the research and treatment of cancer.

Through emphasis on high-caliber scientific meetings, dedication to education and outreach activities, focus on initiatives of major importance to the field, and commitment to collaborations with like-minded organizations and patient advocacy groups, SITC brings together all aspects of the cancer immunology and immunotherapy community in an effort to make cancer immunotherapy one of the four standards of care and the word “cure” a reality for cancer patients living with this disease.

The goals of SITC are directed towards the rapid dissemination of information in these areas to expedite the safe transfer of both basic and applied research to the clinical setting.

Activities 
SITC programs include the Annual Meeting & Pre-Conference Programs, Advances in Cancer Immunotherapy educational series, and an array of collaborative education programs, intended to bring together leaders to discuss the latest developments in cancer immunotherapy and biological therapy, and to focus on and educate the clinical and translational aspects of biologic approaches to cancer treatment.

Organization

Membership 
SITC's membership consists of leaders in the field of cancer immunotherapy and up-and-coming scientists. This group includes research scientists, physician scientists, clinicians, patients, patient advocates, government representatives and industry leaders. In 2018, SITC grew to more than 2,400 members, representing 22 medical specialties and 42 countries around the world and are engaged in research and treatment of cancer.

Partnerships and collaborations 
SITC partners and collaborates with many domestic and international companies, organizations and academic centers around the world, including:

Sponsors 
SITC's current financial supporters include:

Publications 
The Journal for ImmunoTherapy of Cancer (JITC) is the official journal of the Society for Immunotherapy of Cancer (SITC).  It is an open access, online journal created by the Society for the many stakeholders in the tumor immunology and cancer immunotherapy community. JITC is an outlet and targeted publication platform dedicated to advancing the science of tumor immunology and cancer immunotherapy.

References

External links 
 Official website
 Journal for ImmunoTherapy of Cancer

Cancer organizations based in the United States
Medical associations based in the United States
Medical and health organizations based in Wisconsin
Immunology organizations